Boris Lvovich Vannikov (26 August 1897 – 22 February 1962) was a Soviet government official and three-star general.

Vannikov was People's Commissar for Defense Industry from December 1937 until January 1939 and People's Commissar for Armament from January 1939 through June 1941. On June 7, 1941, Vannikov was arrested for "failing to carry out his duties" and was condemned to death. However, as the war with Germany started on 22 June, Vannikov was released on 25 July 1941 and then appointed People's Commissar for Ammunition from February 1942 through June 1946. Two siblings of his died during fighting in World War II.

From 1945 through 1953 Vannikov was Head of the 1st Main Directorate of the Council of People's Commissars of the USSR. In this position Vannikov worked under direct leadership of Lavrenty Beria overseeing the Soviet atomic bomb project. He inadvertently helped the nuclear scientists Yulii Khariton and Igor Kurchatov by walking close to their test reactor. His body fat reflected enough neutrons to approach criticality.

Boris Chertok, a Soviet military engineer, described Vannikov as "quite energetic, typically Jewish in appearance, sometimes rudely cynical, sometimes very blunt, and friendly and amicable when necessary... [with] quite exceptional organizational skills." Chertok claimed that "Vannikov’s tremendous contribution was to eliminate problems in ammunitions production and delivery. Therefore, it was not the least bit surprising that Stalin and Beriya, despite Vannikov’s past and his Jewish ethnicity, put him in charge of all operations for the development of the atomic bomb as head of the First Main Directorate."

Vannikov was the first person who was awarded (by 2nd and 3rd star) as a Hero of Socialist Labor three times (in 1942, 1949, and 1954), and he was twice awarded the Stalin Prize (in 1951 and 1953). After Beria's arrest and death in 1953, Vannikov was moved to the position of First Deputy Minister of Medium Machine-Building Ministry (made of the 1st, 2nd and 3rd Main Directorares merged and being the designated code-name for the nuclear related R&D and production in the USSR). He retired in 1958.

Vannikov purportedly disliked the Soviet regime. According to Beria's son, Vannikov said of the Soviet Union, "I hate it and yet I work for it. And I work honestly. What else can I do?" and that "Instead of shutting myself up in research I had to go into politics... Thereafter, I was done for."

Vannikov died on 22 February, 1962 in Moscow, and his ashes were interred in Kremlin Wall Necropolis.

References

 Записки наркома (Narkom's Essays). Prepared for publication in 1960s, it was published in 1988 in Znamya magazine (Знамя, 1988:1-2)

1897 births
1962 deaths
Military personnel from Baku
People from Baku Governorate
Azerbaijani Jews
Communist Party of the Soviet Union members
People's commissars and ministers of the Soviet Union
Members of the Supreme Soviet of the Soviet Union
Soviet colonel generals
Soviet Jews in the military
Heroes of Socialist Labour
Recipients of the Order of Lenin
Recipients of the Order of Suvorov, 1st class
Recipients of the Order of Kutuzov, 1st class
Stalin Prize winners
Burials at the Kremlin Wall Necropolis